Bogdan Kirizmić (1358–71), was a Serbian nobleman, merchant from Prizren,  protovestijar (financial manager) in the service of King Vukašin (co-ruled Serbia 1365–71, alongside Emperor Stefan Uroš V).

Life
Kirizmić was from Prizren, the son of Rajko Kirizmić. In 1354, a Bogdan, the son of noblewoman Višeslava was mentioned; this was either Bogdan Kirizmić or kaznac Bogdan (fl. 1363).

Kirizmić was first mentioned in Ragusan documents in 1358, as a merchant in Prizren. At the end of July 1361, the emissaries of Emperor Uroš V, Kirizmić and a Marko (possibly Marko Mrnjavčević), arrived at Ragusa (Dubrovnik).

He was the richest merchant in Serbia, and became the protovestijar of King Vukašin (being mentioned with the title on June 10, 1371). Although mentioned in Ragusan documents as the protovestijar of Vukašin, he would at the same time serve as the protovestijar of Emperor Uroš V.

References

Sources

14th-century Serbian nobility
People of the Serbian Empire
Economy of Serbia in the Middle Ages
People from Prizren
14th-century births
14th-century deaths
Protovestiarioi
Medieval Serbian magnates